Hanul of Riga also Hennecke, Hannike, Hans, Hanco, Hanulo  (date of birth unknown – died between February 25, 1417 and December 12, 1418 in Kraków) was a merchant from Riga of German origin, a burgess of Vilnius. In 1382–87, he was namiestnik (mayor) of Vilnius. In 1382, during the Lithuanian Civil War (1381–84) between Jogaila and Kęstutis, Hanul led the city residents and surrendered Vilnius to Jogaila, who was soon to be crowned as King of Poland. He was later the trusted advisor of Jogaila and Skirgaila and participated in many diplomatic missions. He also contributed to the establishment of trade relations between Lithuania and Poland.

References

14th-century births
1410s deaths
Businesspeople from Riga
Mayors of Vilnius